Annenkov or Annenkova (feminine) is a Russian surname. Notable people with the surname include:

Andriy Annenkov (born 1969), Ukrainian football player
Irina Annenkova (born 1999), Russian rhythmic gymnast
Mikhail Annenkov (1835–1899), Russian nobleman, author, military officer and engineer
Nikolay Annenkov (1899–1999), Soviet actor
Nicholas Annenkov (1799–1865), Russian general 
Pavel Annenkov (1813–1887), Russian literary critic
Varvara Annenkova (1795–1866), Russian poet
Yury Annenkov, also known as Georges Annenkov, (1889–1974), Russian artist

See also
Annenkov Island, off South Georgia

Russian-language surnames